Barrington Hall may refer to:

 Barrington Hall, Essex
 Barrington Hall (Berkeley, California)
 Barrington Hall (Roswell, Georgia)

Architectural disambiguation pages